Alyxia menglungensis is a species of flowering plant in the family Apocynaceae, that is endemic to China.

References

menglungensis
Flora of China
Endangered plants
Taxonomy articles created by Polbot